Stoke Wake is a hamlet and civil parish, formerly part of the Whiteway hundred in north Dorset, England. It is situated under Bulbarrow Hill on the edge of the Blackmore Vale, west of Blandford Forum. Dorset County Councils 2013 mid-year estimate of the parish population is 60.

In 1086 Stoke Wake was recorded in the Domesday Book as Stoche; it had 15 households, 4 ploughlands,  of meadow and one mill. It was in the hundred of Hilton and the lord and tenant-in-chief was Shaftesbury Abbey.

The parish church was built in 1872.

Notes

Villages in Dorset